Willam Patrick Bradley (born in Williamsport, Pennsylvania in 1867- June 1938) was a lawyer, who also served in the United States Navy.  He served on the City Council of Detroit, Michigan from 1919 to 1938.

Career 
He attended the local catholic parish schools and then attended Niagara College in Niagara, New York.  Upon graduation from Niagara College, Bradley stayed on at Niagara College and studied for his  Bar Exam.  He became an Attorney.  He then traveled to Ireland to visit some of his relatives and wrote article for the local Williamsport Newspaper. Will was paid $5 for each article he wrote and that enabled him to continue his travels from Ireland to see many countries in Europe.  He sent post cards back to his family and his sister saved them.  She later became a catholic nun.

Upon returning to Williamsport, Bradley decided to travel to Kansas City.  In Kansas City, he enlisted in the Navy.

Bradley served in the Navy for 20 years and then returned to Williamport to practice law, until his father, Patrick J Bradley died in 1915.  William and his brother Lewis Jones Bradley moved to Detroit, Michigan.  It was in Detroit where he met his wife Fidelis Fox from Pittsford, VT.  She was a nurse at Providence Hospital in Detroit.

Bradley was the Chairman of the Great Lakes Tide Water Commission.

He practiced law in Detroit, and also was part owner of a Brewery. He owned a Real Estate Firm and he was owner of the Cadilac Moving and Storage Company.  Will was active in working with the Detroit Red Wings in building the Olympia Hockey Arena in 1924.

Bradley was elected at large as a Non-Partisan Candidate to the Detroit City Council and served from 1919 until he died in June 1938.  On several occasions, he was Chairman of the City Council and was Acting Mayor in 1924 filling in for the Mayor  when the mayor died in office.

William and Fidelis had three sons, William P. Bradley Jr, John Fox Bradley and Dan Fox Bradley.  They built a home at 540 East Grand Blvd. in Detroit. East Grand Boulevard was the entrance way to Belle Isle Park, which William helped get built  His name is on the Plaque Dedicating the Belle Isle Bridge.

References 

Politicians from Williamsport, Pennsylvania
Lawyers from Detroit
Detroit City Council members
1867 births
1938 deaths
20th-century American politicians